Jorge Rosiñol Abreu (born 18 September 1958) is a Mexican politician affiliated with the PAN. As of 2013 he served as Deputy of the LXII Legislature of the Mexican Congress representing Campeche.

References

1958 births
Living people
Politicians from Ciudad del Carmen
National Action Party (Mexico) politicians
21st-century Mexican politicians
Municipal presidents in Campeche
Members of the Congress of Campeche
Deputies of the LXII Legislature of Mexico
Members of the Chamber of Deputies (Mexico) for Campeche